Sean McVay (born January 24, 1986) is an American football coach who is the head coach for the Los Angeles Rams of the National Football League (NFL). He became the youngest NFL head coach in the modern era when he was hired by the Rams in 2017 at the age of 30. McVay is also the youngest head coach to win a Super Bowl, make multiple Super Bowl appearances, and be named the AP NFL Coach of the Year.

Within his first year, McVay turned a Rams team that had the league's lowest scoring offense the previous year into the top-scoring team of 2017 en route to a division title. The season also marked the Rams' first winning record since 2003 and first playoff appearance since 2004. Over the following seasons, McVay led the Rams to two Super Bowl appearances and won the franchise's first since 1999 in Super Bowl LVI. His success in Los Angeles is credited with changing NFL hiring philosophies towards younger head coaches, also known as the "Sean McVay effect".

Early life
McVay was born in Dayton, Ohio, the son of Tim and Cindy McVay. Sean's father, Tim, played football as a defensive back at Indiana University. His family lived in Dayton until Sean was six years old. His grandfather, John McVay, was the head football coach at the University of Dayton from 1965 to 1972, head coach of the New York Giants later in the 1970s, and general manager of the San Francisco 49ers for the team's five Super Bowl championships during the 1980 and 1990s.

McVay graduated from Marist School in Brookhaven, Georgia, in 2004. He was a four-year starter at Marist as a quarterback and defensive back for the War Eagles high school football team and the first player in school history to amass 1,000 yards rushing and passing in consecutive seasons. McVay totaled 2,600 yards rushing and 40 rushing touchdowns during his career and also passed for 2,500 yards and 18 touchdowns, leading the War Eagles to a 26–3 record, including a 14–1 record and state championship his senior year, when he was also named the Georgia 4A Offensive Player of the Year over future NFL Hall of Fame wide receiver Calvin Johnson.

College career
McVay attended Miami University in Oxford, Ohio, where he played college football as a wide receiver from 2004 to 2007, earning Miami's Scholar-Athlete Award in 2007. McVay recorded 39 receptions for 312 yards for the RedHawks in his college career. He graduated from Miami in 2008 with a B.S. in Health and Sports Studies.

Collegiate statistics

Coaching career

Tampa Bay Buccaneers
McVay began his coaching career as an assistant wide receivers coach with the Tampa Bay Buccaneers in 2008 under head coach Jon Gruden.

Florida Tuskers (UFL)
In 2009, McVay was the quality control/wide receivers coach for the Florida Tuskers of the United Football League (UFL). With Florida, McVay first worked under Jay Gruden, who was the Tuskers offensive coordinator.

Washington Redskins

In 2010, McVay was hired as the assistant tight ends coach for the Washington Redskins under head coach Mike Shanahan. The following season, McVay was promoted to tight ends coach, a position he held through the 2013 season.

On January 14, 2014, McVay was promoted to offensive coordinator by new Redskins head coach Jay Gruden.

Los Angeles Rams
The hiring made him the youngest head coach in the NFL's modern era, surpassing Lane Kiffin, who was  old when hired by the Oakland Raiders in 2007, and the youngest since the Rams hired 27-year-old Art Lewis in 1938. McVay inherited a Rams team that finished 2016 in last place in points, total yards, touchdown passes and first downs, a team later ranked as having the second-worst offense of the decade based on Football Outsiders' DVOA (Defense-adjusted Value Over Average) statistic.

On February 8, 2017, McVay hired Matt LaFleur as his offensive coordinator. LaFleur had previously worked with McVay in Washington when McVay was tight ends coach and LaFleur was quarterbacks coach.

2017 season
On September 10, 2017, McVay made his regular-season head coaching debut against the Indianapolis Colts, and led the Rams to a 46–9 victory in a home game at the Los Angeles Memorial Coliseum. Following a Week 2 27–20 loss to McVay's former team, the Washington Redskins, the Rams pulled off a close 41–39 road victory over the San Francisco 49ers on Thursday Night Football. During Week 4, the Rams turned a 16–24 deficit into a 35–30 upset road victory over the Dallas Cowboys, but they lost their next game to NFC West division rival Seattle Seahawks at home by a score of 16–10. Regardless, in just five games, the Rams offense scored a total of 142 (later 151) points, a league leader and franchise high. The Rams went on to beat the Jacksonville Jaguars on the road by a score of 27–17 in Week 6 and the Arizona Cardinals by a score of 33–0 in an NFL International Series game for the team's first shutout win since 2014, as well as raising their record to 5–2 for the first time since 2004 (the last time the team made the playoffs) and a first-place lead in the NFC West. McVay coached the Rams to a blowout against the New York Giants in their highest-scoring game, a 51–17 road victory, raising the Rams' record to 6–2. The Rams would win another home game against the Houston Texans by a score of 33–7 to raise their record to 7–2, which was their best record of the season since 2001.

In Weeks 11 and 12, the Rams lost to the Minnesota Vikings on the road by a score of 24–7 but won at home against the New Orleans Saints 26–20 to raise their record to 8–3. During a Week 13 32–16 road victory over the Cardinals, the Rams achieved their first winning season since 2003. The next weeks: Week 14, Week 15, and Week 16, the Rams had two victories over the Seattle Seahawks in a 42–7 road victory and the Tennessee Titans in a close 27–23 road victory although they still lost to the Philadelphia Eagles 43–35. McVay's first season with the Rams has seen them dramatically improve their record from the 2016 season and the team's first winning season and division title since 2003 and its first playoff berth since 2004. In the process, the Rams became the first team to have the top scoring offense in the league a year after finishing with the lowest the previous year.

McVay made his playoff head coaching debut against the Atlanta Falcons, but the Rams lost in the Wild Card Round by a score of 26–13. On January 19, 2018, he was named NFL Coach of the Year by the Associated Press.

2018 season: Super Bowl LIII run

Offensive coordinator Matt LaFleur left his position with the Rams on January 30, 2018, to move up to play caller as offensive coordinator for the Tennessee Titans and was not replaced.

The Rams started the season 8–0, their best start to a season since 1969, but they lost in New Orleans to the New Orleans Saints in Week 9 by a score of 45–35 to fall to 8–1. After defeating the Seattle Seahawks 36–31 in Week 10, the Rams beat the Kansas City Chiefs by a score of 54–51 in Week 11 on Monday Night Football in a highly-anticipated matchup that was originally scheduled to be played in Mexico City, but was shifted to Los Angeles due to poor field conditions.

Following a bye week, the Rams traveled to Detroit and defeated the Detroit Lions by a score of 30–16 to clinch their second straight NFC West title. McVay then endured his first losing streak as a head coach as the Rams stumbled in back-to-back losses to the Chicago Bears (15–6) and the Philadelphia Eagles (30–23), both on NBC Sunday Night Football. The Rams bounced back to defeat the Arizona Cardinals 31–9 and San Francisco 49ers 48–32 in the final two weeks to finish the regular season with a 13–3 record, tied for the second-most wins in franchise history.

In the Divisional Round, the Rams defeated the Dallas Cowboys by a score of 30–22. The following week in the controversial NFC Championship Game, the Rams beat the Saints on the road by a score of 26–23 in overtime on a game-winning field goal by Greg Zuerlein in overtime to send the Rams to Super Bowl LIII, their first NFL championship appearance since Super Bowl XXXVI in 2002. It was also the Rams' first Super Bowl appearance while based in Los Angeles since Super Bowl XIV in 1980. At age 33, McVay became the youngest head coach to lead his team to the Super Bowl. However, the success would be short-lived, as the Rams would fall to Tom Brady and the New England Patriots, with the Rams failing to score a single touchdown in the 13–3 loss (the lowest-scoring Super Bowl in history).

2019 season
The 2019 season was a disappointment, as the Rams were victims of the Super Bowl Losers' Curse and missed the playoffs with a 9–7 record. The Rams started the season 3–0, winning against the Carolina Panthers, New Orleans Saints, and Cleveland Browns. However, they then lost three straight to the Tampa Bay Buccaneers, Seattle Seahawks, and San Francisco 49ers. Before a Week 9 bye, they won two games against the Atlanta Falcons and Cincinnati Bengals. The Rams then won four and lost four. The team faced problems during the season due to a combination of factors and lost on the road by a score of 34–31 in a heartbreaking fashion in a must-win Week 16 contest against the 49ers.

2020 season
After a win over the Dallas Cowboys in the season opener, the Rams started off the first half of the 2020 season going 5–3, with wins over the Philadelphia Eagles, New York Giants, Washington Football Team, and Chicago Bears. However, they lost to the Buffalo Bills, San Francisco 49ers, and Miami Dolphins. The Rams finished the season with a 10–6 record with wins over the Seattle Seahawks, Tampa Bay Buccaneers, Arizona Cardinals, and New England Patriots. Their remaining losses came against the New York Jets, 49ers, and Seahawks.

After a 30–20 road victory over the Seahawks in the Wild Card Round, McVay and the Rams visited the first-seeded Green Bay Packers at Lambeau Field, who were led by one of McVay's former offensive coordinators, Matt LaFleur. The matchup was the postseason contest with the youngest combined age between both head coaches in more than 50 years. The Rams lost on the road by a score of 32–18 in the Divisional Round.

2021 season: Super Bowl LVI victory
There were high expectations for the Rams after trading for former Detroit Lions quarterback Matthew Stafford in the offseason. The Rams opened the season at home against the Chicago Bears and won 34–14. They then won their next two games against the Indianapolis Colts, and the reigning Super Bowl champion Tampa Bay Buccaneers before losing to the Arizona Cardinals. The Rams then beat the Seattle Seahawks on Thursday Night Football 26–17, then defeated the New York Giants on the road by a score of 38–11 the following week. Wins at home against the Detroit Lions (28–19) and on the road against Houston Texans (38–22) pushed the Rams' record to 7–1.

However, the Rams stumbled as they passed the midway point of the season, losing 28–16 to the visiting Tennessee Titans during Week 9 on Sunday Night Football, then getting routed 31–10 by the host San Francisco 49ers on Monday Night Football in Week 10. After a Week 11 bye, the Rams' losing streak continued when they lost to the Green Bay Packers on the road by a score of 36–28, falling to a 7–4 record. The Rams snapped their losing streak with a 37–7 blowout at home against the Jacksonville Jaguars, then followed that up with an impressive 30–23 road victory over the Cardinals, which vaulted the Rams back into the NFC West race. Despite a two-day delay due to COVID-19 precautions, the Rams beat the Seahawks 20–10 at SoFi Stadium to improve to 10–4, then scored impressive road wins over the Minnesota Vikings (30–23) and the Baltimore Ravens (20–19) to clinch an NFC playoff spot. However, the regular-season ended with a 27–24 overtime loss to the 49ers, in which the Rams squandered a 17–0 lead. Despite the loss, the Rams' first under McVay after they had led at halftime (a streak of 45 straight games), the Rams claimed the NFC West division title by virtue of Arizona's loss to Seattle that same day.

In the first NFL playoff game played on Monday Night Football, the Rams defeated their NFC West rival, the Arizona Cardinals, by a score of 34–11. With the win, McVay's record over the Cardinals improved to 10–1 over five seasons. The following week, the Rams traveled to Tampa Bay and narrowly beat the Buccaneers 30–27. The win put the Rams into the NFC Championship Game for the second time under McVay's leadership, giving him his fifth postseason victory, the most in team history. Returning to SoFi Stadium for the NFC Championship Game, the Rams rallied from a 10-point deficit to defeat their other NFC West rival, the San Francisco 49ers, by a score of 20–17, with McVay winning his second conference title and advancing to Super Bowl LVI, where the Rams defeated the Cincinnati Bengals by a score of 23–20, rallying with a late touchdown to win. The victory made McVay the youngest head coach in NFL history to win the Super Bowl at age 36.

2022 season
Prior to the season opener, the Rams announced that McVay and General Manager Les Snead had signed extensions with the team, keeping them with the franchise until the 2026 season. McVay and the Rams would host the Buffalo Bills in their first game for the 2022 season, where they unveiled their Super Bowl championship banner at SoFi Stadium. The Rams would lose 31–10, in what would be the first time McVay would lose a season opener, and the first time he would have an active season record under .500. McVay and the Rams struggled to defend their title throughout the season, as the team lost key members Matthew Stafford, Cooper Kupp, and Aaron Donald to injury for significant portions of the year. The Rams would finish 5–12 and miss the playoffs in McVay's first losing season as a head coach.

With the Rams having traded significant draft capital and given notably high contracts to pursue their Super Bowl championship, many predicted that a team rebuild loomed during the offseason. Despite McVay signing an extension when the season began, speculation arose that McVay would not want to take part in a rebuild and would instead step away from the team before the next season began. Shortly after the regular season finished, sources stated that McVay would stay as head coach for the next season.

Head coaching record

Coaching tree
McVay has served under four head coaches:
Jon Gruden, Tampa Bay Buccaneers (2008)
Jim Haslett, Florida Tuskers (2009)
Mike Shanahan, Washington Redskins (2010–2013)
Jay Gruden, Washington Redskins (2014–2016)

Five of McVay's assistants have been hired as head coaches in the NFL or NCAA:
Matt LaFleur, Green Bay Packers (2019–present) 
Zac Taylor, Cincinnati Bengals (2019–present)
Jedd Fisch, Arizona (2021–present)
Brandon Staley, Los Angeles Chargers (2021–present)
Kevin O'Connell, Minnesota Vikings (2022–present)

The "Sean McVay effect"

Because of McVay's success as the Rams head coach at a young age, as well as his offensive prowess, NFL teams have started to look more towards younger offensive-minded coaches to be their head coaches, as opposed to coaches with defensive backgrounds or more experience. This included Matt LaFleur (six years older than McVay), Zac Taylor (three years older than McVay), and Kevin O'Connell (eight months older than McVay), who all served as offensive assistants to McVay, along with Mike McDaniel (three years older than McVay), who was on the Washington Redskins coaching staff with McVay from 2011–13. Others have also cited the fast rise of Kliff Kingsbury (six years older than McVay) from being ousted as head coach at a struggling Texas Tech program to being hired as head coach of the Arizona Cardinals in a period of three months as a result of McVay's offensive success. This term would later be expanded to include the hiring of relatively younger head coaches with defensive backgrounds as well.

Personal life
McVay resides in Hidden Hills, California, with his wife, Veronika Khomyn, a former model from Ukraine whom he met when he was a coach for Washington and she was a student at George Mason University. He and Khomyn previously lived in Encino along with Chris Shula, the Rams linebackers coach, as a housemate. They were engaged on June 22, 2019, while vacationing in Cannes, France. They married on June 4, 2022. McVay's grandfather, John McVay, was also an NFL head coach, having coached the New York Giants from 1976 to 1978 before going on to serve as an executive for the San Francisco 49ers from 1980 to 1996.

References and notes

External links

 Los Angeles Rams profile
  Coaching record at Pro-Football-Reference.com

1986 births
Living people
American football quarterbacks
American football wide receivers
Florida Tuskers coaches
Marist School (Georgia) alumni
Miami RedHawks football players
Los Angeles Rams head coaches
National Football League offensive coordinators
Super Bowl-winning head coaches
Sportspeople from Dayton, Ohio
Tampa Bay Buccaneers coaches
Washington Redskins coaches
Players of American football from Dayton, Ohio